3-Hydroxyisobutyric aciduria is a disorder of valine metabolism characterised by urinary excretion of 3-Hydroxyisobutyric acid.

References

External links 

Inborn errors of metabolism